Rayavaram is a village in Kadapa district in the state of Andhra Pradesh in India.

Situated 30 km from Rayachoti.

ATM available - TATA INDICASH

References 

Villages in Kadapa district